Hou Zhanbiao (born 1 September 1986) is a Paralympian athlete from China competing mainly in F46 classification throwing events.

Athletics history
Hou represented China at the 2012 Summer Paralympics in London, entering the shot put (T46) event. He won the silver medal recording a distance of 15.57 metres. As well as the Paralympics Hou has also been part of two Chinese teams to compete at the IPC Athletics World Championships, in 2011 in Christchurch and 2015 in Doha. He finished fourth in the discus in 2011, but won gold in the same event in 2015, setting a new world record of 52.64 metres. At Doha he also entered the javelin (9th) and shot put (4th) events.

Personal history
Hou was born in Shijiazhuang, China in 1986. He was born without part of his left arm.

Notes

Paralympic athletes of China
Athletes (track and field) at the 2012 Summer Paralympics
Paralympic silver medalists for China
Living people
Medalists at the 2012 Summer Paralympics
Chinese male discus throwers
Chinese male javelin throwers
Chinese male shot putters
Sportspeople from Shijiazhuang
1986 births
Paralympic medalists in athletics (track and field)
World Para Athletics Championships winners
21st-century Chinese people
Medalists at the 2014 Asian Para Games
Medalists at the 2018 Asian Para Games
Paralympic shot putters